Azimganj City railway station is a railway station on the Howrah–Azimganj line of Howrah railway division of Eastern Railway zone. It is situated beside Police Station Road, Azimganj town of Murshidabad district in the Indian state of West Bengal. It serves the Jiaganj–Azimganj area.

History
In 1913, the Hooghly–Katwa Railway constructed a -wide  broad gauge line from Bandel to Katwa, and the Barharwa–Azimganj–Katwa Railway constructed the -wide  broad gauge Barharwa–Azimganj–Katwa loop. With the construction of the Farakka Barrage and opening of the railway bridge in 1971, the railway communication picture of this line were completely changed. Total 32 trains including few express and passengers stop at Azimganj City railway station.

References

Railway stations in Murshidabad district
Howrah railway division